Spithridates (fl. 365–334 BC) was a Persian satrap of Lydia and Ionia under the high king Darius III Codomannus. He was one of the Persian commanders at the Battle of the Granicus, in 334 BC. In this engagement, while he was aiming a blow from behind at Alexander the Great, his arm was cut off by Cleitus the Black and he subsequently died. 

Diodorus calls him Spithrobates, and appears to confound him with Mithridates, the son-in-law of Darius, whom Alexander slew in the battle with his own hand; while what Arrian records of Spithridates, Diodorus accounts it  for his brother Rhosaces.

Spithridates was replaced by the Hellenistic satrap Asander in his territories.

Sources
Smith, William (editor); Dictionary of Greek and Roman Biography and Mythology, "Spithridates (2)", Boston, (1867)

Opponents of Alexander the Great
334 BC deaths
Achaemenid satraps of Lydia
Military leaders of the Achaemenid Empire
4th-century BC Iranian people
Darius III
Year of birth unknown
Achaemenid satraps of Ionia
Military personnel of the Achaemenid Empire killed in action